Samanda block is a Community Development Block in East Garo Hills district, Meghalaya state, India.  the 2011 Census of India, the total population of the block was 56,235.

Villages 
 the 2011 Census of India, the block contains 148 villages.

 Adugre
 Akel Agalgre
 Akelgre
 Ampanggre
 Asa Bibra
 Asimgre
 Asiragre
 Bande Ampang
 Bandigre
 Bangong Bingbanggre
 Bangong Gittinggre
 Bangong Imsokgre
 Bangong Singwegre
 Bansam Awe
 Bansam Kakwagre
 Bansamgre
 Bansinggre
 Bawe Duragre
 Bawegre
 Bilgipgre
 Bolkinggre
 Chachat Jangkigre
 Chachat Karubra
 Chachatgre
 Chekwe Bibra
 Chima Dachitgittim
 Chimagre Gradekgittim
 Chimagre Songgital
 Chiminminggre
 Chiokgre
 Chiranggre
 Chiringgre
 Chonggigre
 Daribokgre
 Dawa Chipitgre
 Dawa Gittinggre
 Dawa Kosigittin
 Dawa Matchakolgre
 Dawa Nengjata
 Dawa Nengkatok
 Dawa Songgittal
 Demogre
 Denggagre Songgital
 Dilma Debrakgre
 Dilma Dilsek
 Dilma Gandinanggre
 Dilma Kawak
 Dilma Rimtonggre
 Dilma Songgital
 Dilma Songgitcham
 Dinajekgre
 Dinaminggre
 Dobet Kolgre Apotgittim
 Doktilgre
 Dolwarigre
 Dombegre
 Dorakgre
 Dorengkigre
 Ganing Bibra
 Ganinggre
 Gitokgre
 Gonggre
 Gongnagre
 Jakopgre
 Jaljenggre
 Jingamgre
 Jongmegre
 Kakwa Bawegre
 Kakwa Duragre
 Kakwa Rongbokgre
 Kakwa Songma
 Kalak Dorek
 Kalak Songgital
 Kalak Songgitcham
 Mandal Nokwat
 Mandalgipi
 Mandalgre
 Mangrugre
 Matchok Akawe
 Megagre Songgital
 Megagre Songgitcham
 Mejaligre
 Meronggre
 Nabokgre
 Naregre
 Nengkra Awe
 Nengkra Bolsalgre
 Nengkra Watregrittim
 Nengmandalgre
 Nengsitgre
 New Chidekgiri
 New Rangmalgre
 Pakwakgre
 Patalgre
 Pillonggre
 Ragitikgre
 Rambogre
 Rangmalgre Songgitcham
 Rapdikgre
 Rengregre
 Rongakgre
 Rongalgre
 Rongatagre
 Rongbing Apot
 Rongbing Boldak
 Rongbing Dalbot
 Rongbinggre
 Rongchek Chambugong
 Rongchek Manda
 Rongkem
 Rongkinggre
 Rongongre
 Rongregre
 Rongrekgre
 Rongribo Amalgre
 Rongribo Chibolgre
 Rongribo Gongmagre
 Rongribo Kamagre
 Rongribo Kimemanggre
 Rongribo Retenggre
 Rongribo Watregre
 Rongsak Bazar
 Rongsak Songgital
 Rongsak Songma
 Rukalgre
 Samanda Bolwarigre
 Samanda Chinemgre
 Samanda Grenanggre
 Samanda Megapgre
 Samanda Patranggre
 Samanda Prapgre
 Samanda Rikwarenggre
 Samanda Wagetgre
 Sampalgre
 Sawilgre
 Siso Bibra
 Sobokgre
 Sobokgre B
 Songma Adinggre
 Songma Enggok
 Songmagre
 Suchilgre Songgital
 Suchilgre Songgitcham
 Tongbol Songgitcham
 Tongbolgre Kamagre
 Udugre
 Wakgitcho
 Wannanggre

References 

East Garo Hills district
Northeast India